William Kinney may refer to:
 William Kinney (Illinois politician) (1781–1843), American pioneer, politician and lieutenant governor of Illinois
 William Ansel Kinney (1860–1930), lawyer and politician in Hawaii
 William Burnet Kinney (1799–1880), American politician and diplomat
 William J. Kinney, alderman and federal liquor inspector